Gemerská Ves is a village and municipality in Revúca District in the Banská Bystrica Region of Slovakia.

History
It arose in 1964 for the union of the Hrkáč and Šankovice in a unique municipality. Hrkáč was first mentioned, in the past, in 1274 (Harkach), when King Ladislav gave the village to Otročok. In the 16th century it suffered because of Turkish devastations. Šankovice, instead, was first mentioned in 1266 (1266 Raas, 1294 Sank, 1421 Sankfalua) and derives its name from the Slavic name Šank. It belonged to families Sánkfalvay, local feudatories, and Hösoy. It was destroyed by Turks in 1556. In the 18th century, it belonged to families Steinicher and local landowners Draskóczy. From 1938 to 1945 both the villages were annexed by Hungary.

Genealogical resources

The records for genealogical research are available at the state archive "Statny Archiv in Banska Bystrica, Slovakia"

 Roman Catholic church records (births/marriages/deaths): 1733-1896 (parish B)
 Greek Catholic church records (births/marriages/deaths): 1817-1939 (parish B)
 Lutheran church records (births/marriages/deaths): 1730-1895 (parish B)

See also
 List of municipalities and towns in Slovakia

External links
https://web.archive.org/web/20080111223415/http://www.statistics.sk/mosmis/eng/run.html 
Surnames of living people in Gemerska Ves

Villages and municipalities in Revúca District